This page provides supplementary chemical data on arsine.

Material Safety Data Sheet  
 SIRI
 Soxal

Structure and properties

Thermodynamic properties

Spectral data

References 

Chemical data pages
Chemical data pages cleanup